The Parrot Who Met Papa is a 1991 collection of two short stories bound dos-à-dos.  The first story is "The Parrot Who Met Papa" by Ray Bradbury.  The other, "The Parrot Who Met Papa (concluded)" is by David Aronovitz, who also published the book.  The Bradbury story first appeared in the magazine Playboy in 1972.

Contents
 "The Parrot Who Met Papa", by Ray Bradbury
 "The Parrot Who Met Papa (concluded)", by David Aronovitz

References

External links
 

1991 short story collections
Short story collections by Ray Bradbury
Books about birds
Fictional parrots
Tête-bêche books